Western Capital may refer to:

China 
 The former name of Xi'an, called Xijing during the Han, Sui and Tang dynasties
 The former name of Luoyang, called Xijing during the Later Jin of the Five Dynasties period
 The former name of Datong, called Xijing during the Liao dynasty
 The former name of Lingwu
 The former name of Fengxiang
 The former name of Linjiang
 The former name of Chengdu, called Xijing by a short-lived successor state to the Ming

Japan 
 Another name of Yamaguchi, Yamaguchi, by contrast with Kyoto "Capital"
 Another name of Osaka, by contrast with Tokyo "Eastern capital"
 Nishikyō-ku, Kyoto, a ward located in western Kyoto

Korean peninsula 
 Pyongyang, was changed to "Sijing" by Wang's Goryeo on the Korean peninsula
 Cheongju, was one of the five small capitals of Unified Silla on the Korean peninsula

Vietnam 
Ho Chi Minh City, formerly called "Saigon"
Thanh Hóa, western capital of Lê dynasty

See also 
Beijing (disambiguation) — Beijing means "Northern Capital".
Nanjing (disambiguation) — Nanjing means "Southern Capital".
Dongjing (disambiguation) — Dongjing means "Eastern Capital".
Shangjing (disambiguation) — Shangjing means "Supreme Capital".